Antaeotricha catharactis is a moth in the family Depressariidae. It was described by Edward Meyrick in 1930. It is found in Brazil.

References

Moths described in 1930
catharactis
Taxa named by Edward Meyrick
Moths of South America